Rev. John E. Pressley House is a historic home located near Bethpage, Cabarrus County, North Carolina. It was built between 1837 and 1851, and is a small two-story Federal and Greek Revival style log house.  It served as the manse for the Coddle Creek and the New Perth Associate Reformed Presbyterian Churches between 1850 and 1900.

It was listed on the National Register of Historic Places in 1986.

References

Associate Reformed Presbyterian Church
Log houses in the United States
Houses on the National Register of Historic Places in North Carolina
Greek Revival houses in North Carolina
Federal architecture in North Carolina
Houses completed in 1851
Houses in Cabarrus County, North Carolina
National Register of Historic Places in Cabarrus County, North Carolina
1851 establishments in North Carolina
Log buildings and structures on the National Register of Historic Places in North Carolina